Shangma Township is a township under the administration of Xiangyuan County, in southern Shanxi, China. , it has 22 villages under its administration.

References 

Township-level divisions of Shanxi
Xiangyuan County